is a Japanese former diver who competed in the 1964 Summer Olympics and in the 1968 Summer Olympics.

References

1943 births
Living people
Japanese male divers
Olympic divers of Japan
Divers at the 1964 Summer Olympics
Divers at the 1968 Summer Olympics
Asian Games medalists in diving
Divers at the 1966 Asian Games
Asian Games gold medalists for Japan
Medalists at the 1966 Asian Games
Universiade medalists in diving
Universiade gold medalists for Japan
Medalists at the 1967 Summer Universiade
20th-century Japanese people